José Mingorance Chimeno (born 10 April 1938 in Castro de Sanabria, Cobreros, Zamora), is a retired Spanish footballer, who played as a defender.

External links
 
 National team data 
 RCD Espanyol archives 
 

1938 births
Living people
Sportspeople from the Province of Zamora
Spanish footballers
Association football defenders
La Liga players
Granada CF footballers
Córdoba CF players
RCD Espanyol footballers
Spain international footballers
Spanish football managers
Granada CF managers
Club Recreativo Granada managers
Loja CD managers